Gymnobela fredericqae is a species of sea snail, a marine gastropod mollusk in the family Raphitomidae.

Description
The length of the shell attains 10 mm.

Distribution
G. fredericqae can be found in the Gulf of Mexico, off the coast of Louisiana.

References

External links
  García E.F. 2005. Six new deep-water molluscan species (Gastropoda: Epitoniidae, Conoidea) from the Gulf of Mexico. Novapex, 6(4): 79-87
  Rosenberg, G.; Moretzsohn, F.; García, E. F. (2009). Gastropoda (Mollusca) of the Gulf of Mexico, Pp. 579–699 in: Felder, D.L. and D.K. Camp (eds.), Gulf of Mexico–Origins, Waters, and Biota. Texas A&M Press, College Station, Texas
 Gastropods.com: Gymnobela fredericqae

fredericqae
Gastropods described in 2005